The Gombe Chimpanzee War, also known as the Four-Year War, was a violent conflict between two communities of chimpanzees in Gombe Stream National Park in the Kigoma region of Tanzania between 1974 and 1978. The two groups were once unified in the Kasakela community. By 1974, researcher Jane Goodall noticed the community splintering. Over a span of eight months, a large party of chimpanzees separated themselves into the southern area of Kasakela and were renamed the Kahama community. The separatists consisted of six adult males, three adult females and their young. The Kasakela was left with eight adult males, twelve adult females and their young. 

During the four-year conflict, all males of the Kahama community were killed, effectively disbanding the community. The victorious Kasakela then expanded into further territory but were later repelled by another community of chimpanzees.

Background 

Prior to the four-year war, before it became a national park, Gombe Stream National Park was known as the Gombe Stream Research Centre. The park is located in the lower region of the Kakombe Valley, and is known for its primate research opportunities first taken advantage of by researcher Jane Goodall, who served as the director of the Gombe Stream Research Centre. The site itself is composed of steep slopes of open woodland, rising above stream valleys lush with riverine forest. 

The chimpanzees roamed across these hills in territorial communities, which divided the chimpanzees into parties ranging from one to 40 members. The term Kasakela refers to one of three areas of research in the central valley with the Kasakela in the north, the Kakombe, and the Mkenke to the south. Evidence of territorialism was first documented once Goodall followed the chimpanzees in their feeding situations, noting their aggressive territorial behavior, but she did not foresee the upcoming conflict. 

After the secession of the Kasakela community, the newly formed Kahama were led by the brother duo Hugh and Charlie, with the other males being Godi, De, Goliath, and the young Sniff. The Kasakela males included Satan, Sherry, Evered, Rodolf, Jomeo, Mike, Humphrey, and Figan, who was an alpha male.

War 
First blood was drawn by the Kasakela community on January 7, 1974, when a party of six adult Kasakela males consisting of Humphrey, Figan, Jomeo, Sherry, Evered, and Rodolf ambushed the isolated Kahama male Godi while he was feeding on a tree. The Kasakela males were accompanied by one female, Gigi, who "charged back and forth around the melee". Despite Godi's attempt to flee, the attackers seized him, threw him on the ground and beat him until he stopped moving. Afterwards, the victorious chimpanzees celebrated boisterously, throwing and dragging branches with hoots and screams, and retreated. Once the Kasakela group had left, Godi stood up again, but probably died of his injuries soon after. This was the first time that any of the chimpanzees had been seen to deliberately attempt to kill a fellow male chimpanzee.

After Godi fell, the Kasakela killed De and then Hugh. In the attack on De, the female Gigi actually took part in combat alongside the Kasakela males. Later on came the elderly Goliath. Throughout the war, Goliath had been relatively friendly with the Kasakela neighbors when encounters occurred. However, his kindness was not reciprocated and he was killed. Only three Kahama males remained: Charlie, Sniff, and Willy Wally, who was crippled from polio. Without a chance to strike back, Charlie was killed next. After his death, Willy Wally disappeared and was never found. The last remaining Kahama male, the young Sniff, survived for over a year. For some time it seemed as if he might escape into a new community or be welcomed back to the Kasakelas, but this did not occur. Sniff, too, fell to the Kasakela war band. Of the females from Kahama, one was killed, two went missing, and three were beaten and kidnapped by the Kasakela males. The Kasakela then succeeded in taking over the Kahama's former territory.

These territorial gains were not permanent, however. With the Kahama gone, the Kasakela territory now butted up directly against the territory of another chimpanzee community, called the Kalande. Cowed by the superior strength and numbers of the Kalande, as well as a few violent skirmishes along their border, the Kasakela quickly gave up much of their new territory. Furthermore, when they moved back northward, the Kasakela were harassed by Mitumba foragers, who also outnumbered the Kasakela community. Eventually hostilities died down and the regular order of things was restored.

Effects on Goodall 

Jane Goodall is known for her research on chimpanzees. The outbreak of the war shocked her, as she had previously considered chimpanzees to be, although similar to human beings, "rather 'nicer. Coupled with her 1975 observation of cannibalistic infanticide by a high-ranking female in the community, the Gombe war revealed the "dark side" of chimpanzee behavior. In her 1990 memoir Through a Window: My Thirty Years with the Chimpanzees of Gombe, she wrote:

Legacy 
When Goodall reported on the events of the Gombe War, her account of a naturally occurring war between chimpanzees was not universally believed. At the time, scientific models of human and animal behavior virtually never overlapped. Some scientists accused her of excessive anthropomorphism; others suggested that her presence, and her practice of feeding the chimpanzees, had created violent conflict in a naturally peaceful society. However, later research using less intrusive methods confirmed that chimpanzee societies, in their natural state, wage war. A 2018 study published in the American Journal of Physical Anthropology concluded that the Gombe War was most likely a consequence of a power struggle between three high-ranking males, which was exacerbated by an unusual scarcity of fertile females.

See also
Killer ape theory, proposed by Raymond Dart in 1953
In literature, the chimpanzee war became the topic of a philosophical poem "The First Civil War in Gombe 1974-1978" by Katarzyna Zechenter, a Polish poet, where the speaking persona concludes: "still, I don’t understand/ were these chimps so human/ or are we such animals."

References

Bibliography

Further reading
  

1970s conflicts
1970s in Tanzania
Chimpanzees
Conflicts in Africa
Jane Goodall
Kigoma Region
Primate behavior
Primatology